Cape Cross (Afrikaans: Kaap Kruis; German: Kreuzkap; Portuguese: Cabo da Cruz) is a headland in the South Atlantic in Skeleton Coast, western Namibia.

History

In 1484, Portuguese navigator and explorer Diogo Cão was ordered by King John II of Portugal to advance south into undiscovered regions along the west coast of Africa, as part of the search for a sea route to India and the Spice Islands. While doing so, he was to choose some particularly salient points and claim them for Portugal by erecting stone crosses called padrões. During his first voyage, thought to have taken place in 1482, he reached a place he called Monte Negro, now called Cabo de Santa Maria, roughly 150 km southwest of today's Benguela, Angola.

During his second voyage, in 1484–1486, Cão reached Cape Cross in January 1486, being the first European to visit this area. He is known to have erected two padrões in the areas beyond his first voyage, one in Monte Negro, and the second at Cape Cross. The current name of the place is derived from this padrão. What can today be found at Cape Cross are two replicas of that first cross.

Padrão

The original Cape Cross padrão was removed in 1893 by Corvette captain Gottlieb Becker, commander of the SMS Falke of the German Navy, and taken to Berlin. The cross is now held in the Deutsches Historisches Museum. A simple wooden cross was put in its place. The wooden cross was replaced two years later by a stone replica.

At the end of the 20th century, thanks to private donations, another cross, more similar to the original one, was erected at the cape along with the first replica.
The inscription on the padrão reads, in English translation:

Seal reserve

Cape Cross is a protected area owned by the government of Namibia under the name Cape Cross Seal Reserve. The reserve is the home of one of the largest colonies of Cape fur seals in the world.

Cape Cross is one of two main sites in Namibia (the other is in Lüderitz) where seals are culled, partly for selling their hides and partly for protecting the fish stock. The economic impact of seals on the fish resources is controversial: while a government-initiated study found that seal colonies consume more fish than the entire fishing industry can catch, animal protection society Seal Alert South Africa estimated less than 0.3% losses to commercial fisheries.

References

External links

Republic of Namibia Ministry of Environment and Tourism: Cape Cross Seal Reserve
The Seals of Nam

Landforms of Namibia
Nature reserves in Namibia
Maritime history of South Africa
Maritime history of Portugal
Portuguese exploration in the Age of Discovery
Headlands of Africa